James Cerretani and Antal van der Duim were the defending champions but only Cerretani chose to defend his title, partnering Nicholas Monroe. Cerretani lost in the first round to Ruben Bemelmans and Jonathan Eysseric.

Neal Skupski and John-Patrick Smith won the title after defeating Bemelmans and Eysseric 7–6(7–3), 6–4 in the final.

Seeds

Draw

References
 Main Draw

Open de Guadeloupe - Doubles
2018 Doubles